The 1999 Holiday Bowl was a college football bowl game played December 29, 1999, in San Diego, California. It was part of the 1999 NCAA Division I-A football season. It featured the Kansas State Wildcats, and the Washington Huskies.

Washington scored the first points of the game, after a 39-yard John Anderson field goal, giving Washington an early 3–0 lead. Kansas State responded with a 1-yard touchdown run by Jonathan Beasley, giving KSU a 7–3 lead. John Anderson kicked his second field goal of the game, a 49 yarder, making it 7–6 Kansas State.

In the second quarter, Kansas State's Jamie Rheem kicked a 41-yard field goal, increasing Kansas State's lead to 10–6. Washington later scored on a 3-yard touchdown run by Pat Coniff, giving Washington a 13–10 halftime lead.

In the third quarter, Jonathan Beasley scored his second touchdown of the game with an 11-yard run, to put Kansas State back on top 17–13. Washington reclaimed the lead after Maurice Shaw took a handoff, and ran 5 yards for a touchdown, 20–17. In the fourth quarter, Jonathan Beasley scored his third rushing touchdown of the game, giving Kansas State the lead for good at 24–20.

References

Holiday Bowl
Holiday Bowl
Kansas State Wildcats football bowl games
Washington Huskies football bowl games
1999 in sports in California
December 1999 sports events in the United States